Different Lifestyles is the fourth album by brother and sister duo BeBe & CeCe Winans, released in the summer of 1991. The album included the singles "'Addictive Love" and a cover of The Staple Singers' "I'll Take You There", featuring Mavis Staples. Both singles topped the R&B charts. Rapper MC Hammer made an appearance on the single "The Blood" at the height of his career. It was one of the top ten albums featured on CCM Magazines "CCM Presents: The 100 Greatest Albums in Christian Music."

Different Lifestyles won the Best Contemporary Soul Gospel Album award at the 1992 Grammy Awards.

Track listing

Personnel 
Vocals
 BeBe Winans – lead vocals, backing vocals (1, 2, 5, 8, 12), BGV arrangements (1, 5, 7, 9, 11, 12)
 CeCe Winans – lead vocals, backing vocals (1, 2, 4, 5, 10, 12), BGV arrangements (7)
 Donna McElroy – backing vocals (1, 2, 7, 12)
 Angie Winans – backing vocals (1, 2, 4, 10, 12)
 Debbie Winans – backing vocals (1, 2, 4, 7-10, 12)
 Joey Kibble – backing vocals (4)
 Carvin Winans – backing vocals (4)
 Marvin Winans – backing vocals (4)
 Michael Winans – backing vocals (4)
 Ronald Winans – backing vocals (4)
 Margaret Bell – backing vocals (4, 7, 10)
 Whitney Houston – backing vocals (4, 10)
 MC Hammer – rap (4)
 Mavis Staples – guest vocals (7)
 Mark Kibble – backing vocals (8, 9)
 Sherrie Kibble – backing vocals (8, 9)
 Mervyn Warren – backing vocals (8, 9)
 Suzan Brittan – backing vocals (9)
 Valerie Davis – backing vocals (9)
 Luther Vandross – backing vocals (9), BGV arrangements (9)
 Mount Calvary Baptist Church Choir (Palm Springs, California) – backing vocals (11)
 Keith Thomas – BGV arrangements (1, 7, 12)
 Rhett Lawrence – BGV arrangements (11)

Musicians
 Keith Thomas – synthesizers (1, 2, 3, 5, 6, 7, 12), bass (1, 2, 3, 5, 6, 7, 12), percussion (1, 12), arrangements (1, 2, 3, 5, 6, 7, 12), drum programming (2, 5, 6, 7), percussion programming (3), string arrangements (3)
 Rhett Lawrence – keyboards (4, 11), bass (4, 11), programming (4, 11), arrangements (4, 11)
 Logan Reynolds – organ (4, 11), synthesizers (8, 9, 10), arrangements (10)
 Howard McCrary – acoustic piano (9), arrangements (9)
 Keith Andes – additional keyboards (10), programming (10)
 Jerry McPherson – guitar (1, 3, 5, 6, 7, 12), electric guitar (2)
 Tom Hemby – acoustic guitar (2, 8)
 Paul Jackson, Jr. – guitar (4, 9, 10, 11)
 Mike Wright – guitar (8)
 Andrew Gouche – bass (8, 9)
 Ricky Lawson – drum programming (1, 12), drums (9)
 Mark Hammond – drum programming (2, 7, 8)
 Steve Brewster – drums (3)
 Joe Hogue – drum programming (10)
 Hen-Gee – scratches (4)
 Terry McMillan – harmonica (7)
 Mark Douthit – saxophone (8)
 Dan Higgins – saxophone (10, 11)
 Kim Hutchcroft – saxophone (11)
 Chris McDonald – trombone (7)
 Mike Haynes – trumpet (7)
 George Tidwell – trumpet (7)
 Jerry Hey – trumpet (10, 11), horn arrangements (10)
 Gary Grant – trumpet (11)
 Cedric Caldwell – arrangements (8)
 Jeff Lippencott – string arrangements and conductor (3)
 Johnny Mandel – string arrangements (3)
 Jeremy Lubbock – string arrangements (8, 9)
 Carl Gorodetzky – contractor (3)
 John Coleman – conductor (8, 9)
 The Nashville String Machine – strings (3)
 National Philharmonic Orchestra – strings (8, 9)

Production 
 Keith Thomas – producer (1, 2, 3, 5, 6, 7, 12), additional producer (8)
 Rhett Lawrence – producer (4, 11), engineer (4, 11), additional producer (9)
 BeBe Winans – producer (8, 9, 10), co-producer (11), executive producer
 Keith Cohen – additional producer (10), mixing (4, 10, 11)
 Scott Folks – executive producer 
 Todd Moore – production coordinator, assistant engineer (1, 2, 3, 5, 6, 7)
 Skip Barrett – production coordinator, album coordinator 
 Louis Upkins, Jr. – production coordinator, album coordinator 
 Bill Whittington – recording (1, 2, 3, 5, 6, 7, 12), mixing (1, 2, 3, 5, 6, 7, 12), additional engineer (9, 10)
 Jeff Balding – engineer (4, 8-11)
 Ronnie Brookshire – engineer (4, 11)
 Sylvia Massy – engineer (4), mix assistant (4)
 Paul McKenna – engineer (4, 11), mixing (11)
 Craig Burbidge – mixing (9)
 Karen Segal – engineer (11)
 John Potoker – recording (12)
 Leslie Ann Jones – additional engineer (9)
 Andrew Kautz – additional engineer (12)
 Todd Chapman – assistant engineer (1)
 Todd Culross – assistant engineer (1, 2, 3, 5, 7)
 Patrick Kelly – assistant engineer (1, 2, 6, 8, 9, 10)
 David Latto – assistant engineer (1, 2, 3, 5, 7)
 John David Parker – assistant engineer (1, 3, 5, 8, 12)
 Kelly Pribble – assistant engineer (1, 2, 3, 5, 7)
 Carry Summers – assistant engineer (1, 2, 6, 8, 9, 10)
 Shane D. Wilson – assistant engineer (1, 2, 3, 5, 6)
 Greg Parker – assistant engineer (2, 6, 10)
 David Hall – assistant engineer (7)
 Thom Russo – assistant engineer (7, 10)
 Steve Hall – mastering 
 Christine Beaudet – album coordinator 
 Tommy Steele – art direction 
 Stan Evenson – design 
 Glenn Sakamoto – design
 David Roth – photography

Studios 
 Recorded at The Bennett House (Franklin, TN); Emerald Sound Studios, Sixteenth Avenue Sound, MasterMix, OmniSound Studios, Hummingbird Sound and Javelina Recording Studios (Nashville, TN); Alpha International Studios (Philadelphia, PA); Quad Recording Studios (New York, NY); Ocean Way Recording, Cherokee Studios, Capitol Studios and The Bunny Hop (Hollywood, CA); Larrabee Sound Studios (North Hollywood, CA); Oakshire Recorders and Summa Studios (Los Angeles, CA); Aire L.A. Studios (Glendale, CA); Can-Am Recorders (Tarzana, CA); Angel Studios (London, UK).
 Mastered at Future Disc (North Hollywood, CA).

Charts 

Singles

See also
List of number-one R&B albums of 1991 (U.S.)

References

1991 albums
Capitol Records albums
BeBe & CeCe Winans albums